Paolo Gigantelli (born 20 June 1979) is a retired Swiss football midfielder.

References

1979 births
Living people
Swiss men's footballers
FC Sion players
AC Bellinzona players
FC Locarno players
Association football midfielders
Swiss Super League players